Hanna Motrechko (born 14 May 1965) is a Soviet rower. She competed in the women's coxless pair event at the 1992 Summer Olympics.

References

1965 births
Living people
Soviet female rowers
Olympic rowers of the Unified Team
Rowers at the 1992 Summer Olympics
Place of birth missing (living people)